John Young or Yonge (1463–1526) was an English churchman and academic. He was titular bishop of Callipolis as suffragan bishop to Richard FitzJames, the bishop of London; and from 1514 his archdeacon of London. He was also Dean of Chichester; and Warden of New College, Oxford, from 1521. He has often been confused with others of the same name, in particular John Yonge.

Notes

1463 births
1526 deaths
16th-century English Roman Catholic priests
Wardens of New College, Oxford
Deans of Chichester
Archdeacons of London
16th-century Roman Catholic titular bishops